The development of state education in New Zealand has been shaped by social and political interactions between Māori as tangata whenua of the land, missionaries, settlers, voluntary organisations and those charged with consolidating central state control.  While the initiatives and systems were driven by colonial ambitions to protect and civilise the indigenous people through assimilation, and install a model of education based on European concepts of the purposes and delivery of learning, there have been times when Māori actively engaged with the process to retain their traditional knowledge and language. Examples of this were Māori participation in the early missions schools, contestation and resistance against many processes of Native schools and the establishment of Kura Kaupapa Māori. Following the signing of the Treaty of Waitangi in 1840, New Zealand became a British Crown Colony, and by 1852 the state of New Zealand had assumed a full legislative role in education.  A series of acts of parliament have attempted to resolve differences between competing interests as the country faced social, cultural and economic challenges. This has continued, arguably, as a desire for democratic and progressive education and the creation and ongoing reform of an education system that aims to reduce inequalities and enable social mobility. As a response to criticism of the education system and the role of the state in managing and delivering equitable learning, there were radical reforms in the late 1980s. These changes  resulted in the establishment of self-managing schools and a decentralization of the system, with  the Department of Education being replaced by the Ministry of Education whose role has been to implement government reforms. Some of these, in governance models for schools, assessment and reporting, class sizes, payroll, school closures and building maintenance, have been controversial.

Origins of primary schools

Traditional Māori education system
Before the arrival of Europeans in New Zealand, Māori had a system of knowledge sharing and application that was learned from elders.  This ensured that there were enough people with the skills to fish, hunt, maintain communities and develop crafts such as weaving and basketry.  Specific skills such as those for wood carving were taught by experts and tribal law was passed on in whare wananga or houses of learning. In Māori society at the time, understanding, respecting and appropriately applying the restrictions around tapu was seen as an essential aspect of education. Waiata,  whakataukī (proverbs),  pūrākau (stories) and whakapapa (genealogy) transmitted "history, values and models of behaviour." This educational system
has been described as "sophisticated and functional...[with a]...strong knowledge base, and a dynamic ability to respond to changing needs and new challenges."

Mission schools
It has been said that when Māori first made contact with a Western European education system, the relationship was characterised by tension as different world views, and at times contradictory, ways of teaching and learning needed to be negotiated.  The first school along European lines for Māori in New Zealand was established in 1816 by the missionary Thomas Kendall of the Anglican Church Missionary Society, at Rangihoua, in the Bay of Islands. The school had 22 students when it opened and the roll peaked at 70 within a year.  The curriculum was described as "mainly rote learning of the alphabet and syllables, missionary-constructed Māori grammar, and catechisms".  Due to issues with attendance and food supplies, the original school closed in 1818 but resumed a  year later at Kerikeri. While the missionaries saw literacy as the way to teach the scriptures,  Māori were said to have become "increasingly interested in learning to read and write...[and]... understanding the new European world with its tall sailing ships, firearms and iron tools."

Early state legislation

Constitution Act 1852
This divided New Zealand into provinces and provincial councils were given responsibility for education, with some financing denominational schools rather than establishing public schools. The six provinces, Auckland, New Plymouth, Wellington, Nelson, Canterbury and Otago determined funding for curriculum and enrolment matters. It has been said that provincial councils managed education differently because each had challenges in "developing a regional infrastructure to support settlement."

Education Ordinance 1847
In 1847, the governor of New Zealand, George Grey, took steps to support the existing network of mission schools through the Educational Ordinance 1847. This outlined the principles for education in New Zealand, including provision  for government inspection and a requirement that "English language would become an integral part of the New Zealand education system for all, including Māori whose first language was Māori." It has been said that the intention of this was to assimilate  Maori based on the "prevailing belief at the time was of the superiority of British civilisation with education seen as a way of "pacifying Maori...[and in]...providing a potential labouring class to help build the young colony."  Another researcher described The Education Ordinance Act [as] a "way of disguising a policy, with aims of social control, assimilation and a means to further establish British rule in New Zealand...[and]...the first of several policies which would serve to see the Mäori language being pushed out of schools in favour of English."

Native Schools Act 1858
This Act enabled income for the mission schools, while stipulating that Māori students must attend as boarders. Numbers of Maori attending these schools were not high by 1850, and because the government struggled to find the funds, most of the mission schools were closed in the 1860s. In the 1850s about 25% of Pākehā could not read or write, and another 14% could only read. Some schools were set up by religious groups, and others by provincial governments. Nelson and Otago had more efficient and better funded education systems than northern provinces such as Auckland. However the Auckland Board of Education was set up 1857 under the Education Act of that year, and had 45 schools by 1863.

Native Schools Act 1867
Under this Act a system of secular village primary schools controlled by the Department of Native Affairs was established.  Māori communities could request a school for their children and contribute land and pay toward building costs and teachers' salaries. In spite of this cost, many Maori communities saw the value of learning English and there were 57 Native schools in the country by 1979. In establishing secular, state-controlled schools, The Act took responsibility for Māori schooling away from the missionaries.  To some, the lawmakers were seen as having good intentions to "civilise" Māori and teach them "Pākehā ways and knowledge", and the process could be seen as supporting Maori in "developing and rebuilding their language, beliefs and values and creating the initiatives to do that." Paul Moon said the Act was an "assimilationist measure" by the government, in response to pressure from missionaries to replace te reo Māori in schools with English. Another researcher noted that "readings of the Māori Schools Bill in 1867 had received much debate in parliament but received acceptance as it appeared that some politicians had genuine concern for Māori interests, but the bill was accepted for purely economic reasons and as a further means of social control."  Historian Alan Ward said that while the Act  continued the "ideas of racial and cultural superiority", there was an element of altruism in it being an attempt by the government to "develop a system of integrated, rather than segregated schooling based on race."

Native Schools Code 1880
In 1979, Native schools came under control of the newly created Department of Education, rather than the Native Department, and effectively operated within a system separate from public schools. The Department of Education was briefed with focussing on curriculum issues and teaching quality, with the goal of assimilating Māori into a state education system that to some extent reflected an 1879 report to the Minister of Education which explicitly stated that  Te Reo Māori "ought to be very little, if at all, used" in any schools. This along with concerns about the quality of teaching, led to the establishment of the Native Schools Code in 1880 by James Pope, the  organising inspector of schools. Pope's vision for the future of Māori education in the country was for the establishment of state schools, requiring Maori communities to contribute land and money toward their maintenance. A curriculum  was established that consisted of reading, writing, arithmetic, geography, but with a strong focus on the importance of English and publications that were disseminated [and] "designed to set expectations in the Native Schools and their surrounding Māori communities as to what the cultural, literary and social ideals were to which Māori should aspire."  Teachers were expected to be "role models for the entire Māori community, therefore linking with the assimilation policy".

Education Act 1877
In 1876 the provinces were abolished, resulting in a move toward a "centralist education system", and the passing of the Education Act 1877 which established New Zealand's first secular, compulsory and free national system of primary education. Under the Act it became compulsory for Pākehā children from ages 7 to 13 to attend primary school and while the Act did not apply to Māori children, they had the option of attending these schools. The Act also sought to establish standards of quality of education as schools varied greatly in their resources and approaches. Before this time children attended schools governed by provincial governments or church or private schools. As with all legislation, the Act's effectiveness depended on its practicability and the resources to enforce it. Many children continued to face difficulties with attending school, especially those from rural areas where their manual labour was important to families. There was a standardised curriculum [that]..."consisted of reading, writing, arithmetic, history and geography, plus sewing and needlework for girls and military drill for boys." The School Attendance Act 1894 confirmed "every child between the age of seven years and the age of thirteen years is hereby required to attend some public school at least six times a week, morning attendances and afternoon attendances being separately counted."

The 1877 Act made some difference to Maori and women, enabling a small proportion to proceed to higher education. For example, over 500 Maori girls went to Hukarere Native Girls' School in the Hawkes bay  between 1877 and 1900. Apirana Ngata went to Te Aute College at the age of 10 in 1884, won a scholarship, and became the first Maori to graduate in a New Zealand university and became a leading politician.

The Act effectively distinguished primary from secondary education: learning in the early years was a universal right, and access to secondary schools was strictly limited.

Early secondary schools 
Secondary schooling was not covered by the 1877 Act, but at that time there were schools at this level established by the New Zealand Company, Provincial Councils, private funders and a small number of  Māori denomination boarding schools which had originally been mission schools under the Education Ordinance of 1847.  Some elementary schools that had added higher classes were also recognised as District High Schools under the 1977 Education Act.

Around 1900, this level of education was generally for the wealthy elite who intended to go to university or enter professional careers, and it was not free. In 1901, less than 3 percent of those aged between 12 and 18 attended public secondary schools. An additional 5 percent attended district high schools (as they were known) or a Standard 7 class. Educational opportunities improved from around 1902 when secondary schools were given grants to admit more pupils.

Changes by the Secretary of Education, George Hogben, raised the leaving age to 14, and the Secondary Schools Act 1903 required secondary schools  to offer free education to all those who "obtained a certificate of competency in the subjects of Standard V." The Education Act 1914 created a national system for grading and appointing teachers...[and confirmed] secondary schools [were required] to offer free education to those who passed a proficiency examination, with grants paid to schools for these pupils." The Certificate of Proficiency became the major determinant of job and career opportunities. By 1921 nearly 13 percent of 12- to 18-year-olds attended a secondary institution (usually for at least two years) and five years later in 1926, and still in 1939, 25 percent did so.

Most schools continued to attempt to offer a curriculum with strong traditional and authoritarian elements. Schools attempted to balance a 'civilising' cultural and moral education with 'utilitarian', vocational training needs. This frustrated those who urged a greater focus on workforce preparation. The battle between vocational and cultural educational imperatives continues today.

Introduction of technical high schools 
An attempt to address workforce training needs was made early in the 20th century by introducing technical high schools. They offered practical, vocationally-orientated training. However, they were not a success. Traditional secondary schools were seen by parents as providing a pathway into high-status professions, and a better life. Technical schools were regarded as being for the less-able.  The Manual and Technical Institutions Acts of 1900 and 1902 did, however, result in the establishment of technical high schools and "the provision of funding to all schools that introduced subjects such as cooking, woodwork and agriculture."

There was a trend for greater emphasis on vocational training during the 1920s and 1930s, which was part of a modern Western trend in the first half of the century away from spiritual, moral and cultural education to a focus on the education of the workforce.

Prior to the 1940s, students were receiving varying curriculums within different types of secondary schools. in 1926 for instance, a quarter of secondary students  went to technical schools, 2 percent to Maori schools (which emphasised manual skills), 12 percent went to district or agricultural high schools, 10 percent to private schools (including Catholic schools), and just over 50 percent went to state secondary schools.

The Thomas Report, 1944 
The Atmore Report, 1930 was an important landmark document, and many of the measures recommended in this were finally supported by the Labour Prime Minister Peter Fraser who pushed through major reforms in the late 1930s and 1940s.

From 1944, as part of the post-Depression era Labour Governments' 'Cradle to Grave' social reforms, secondary education was free and made compulsory up to the age of 15.

The Thomas Report of 1944 was the document which established a common, core and free secondary curriculum for all. This remained in place for fifty years. It introduced School Certificate - examinations sat at the end of Fifth Form, and abolished Matriculation, replacing it with University Entrance - a set of examinations sat at end of Sixth Form. The syllabus material was drawn from both practical and academic strands, with the added aim of catering for students of widely differing abilities, interests, and backgrounds. Despite the core curriculum, including literacy, numeracy, science, social studies, physical education and arts and crafts, the practices of gender differentiation and streaming, it has been argued, ran counter to the rhetoric of equality. Teachers believed that students learned better when streamed into different ability classes as measured by (what is now recognised as) a limited assessment of intelligence IQ. Streams were divided into academic, commercial, and domestic or trades, and students received different versions of the core curriculum.

A number of factors in the post-World War Two era challenged the goals of egalitarian educational opportunities and many students' experiences were still divided by class, race, gender, religion and geography. For example, in 1953, 40 percent of Maori continued to attend Maori primary schools and in 1969 a study of the private Auckland Grammar school demonstrated that only 1 percent came from working and lower-middle-class backgrounds.

Mid 20th century
In 1964, the compulsory school starting age was lowered from 7 years to 6 years.

Integration, 1975 to 1984

Māori education 1960 to 1990
During the 1960s there was a growing awareness that the education system in New Zealand was not meeting the needs of Māori children. The report by Jack Hunn in 1961, known as the Hunn Report, presented data that showed under achievement of Māori in education. The Report recommended a change from assimilation to integration, but little changed because at the time there was a deficit explanation for this that said the problems were largely the result of Māori having "culturally deprived backgrounds". It was recommended that state intervention to address achievement issues should focus on enriching English programmes to overcome this deficit. The Hunn Report also suggested that due to urbanisation of Māori, the separate schools established under the Native Schools Act 1867 were no longer necessary and should be absorbed into the state school system. This concept was supported by the Currie Report in 1962, and by 1969 all Native schools had been "absorbed or closed"  Politician Matiu Rata said he was surprised how smoothly the transition had happened without major criticism, but Hirini Mead who had taught in Native Schools said that the "wholesale transfer" to education board control "came as a shock and betrayal." Linda Tuhiwai Smith however, holds that while the native schools did to some extent fulfill the goal "to  Europeanise, and thereby civilise Māori", this was contested by Māori who engaged "in education as an intervention into the conditions that colonisation had provided for them...[in  a way that was]...remarkable for its perseverance and optimism."

While the Currie Report did reinforce the idea  current at the time that the New Zealand education system was making good progress in achieving its goal of equality of opportunity for all students, it also identified Māori as a group not  being well served by the system, although no recommendations were made to address this.

During the latter half of the 1960s, there was growing support for greater recognition of Māori language, led by groups such as Nga Tamatoa and a petition organised by Patu Hohepa in 1967 which stated that Māori language "forms part of our national heritage."

By the 1970s the state had moved toward recognition of diversity through establishing multicultural programmes and the introduction of taha Māori into some schools in an effort to "quieten Māori resistance based on their culture...[but]...did nothing to challenge the unequal power relations between Māori and non-Māori."  The Educational Development Conference 1974 concluded that there were inequities in society that were being reflected in the education system, and calls for extra funding to address this were not effective as New Zealand struggled with economic issues.  Protest by Māori was increasing though, and the establishment of the Waitangi Tribunal in 1973 highlighted the fact that there was little knowledge of the Treaty in the school curriculum. As Maori questioned how the state could preserve their culture, the importance of the language became paramount and in 1982 the first Te Kohanga Reo immersion language pre-school was opened.  The Waitangi Tribunal recognised that the language needed to be recognised and protected under the Treaty in 1985, and in that year the first Māori language school, Kura Kaupapa Māori, was established at Hoani Waititi Marae in Auckland. These schools were recognised under the Education Amendment Act 1989.

While the goals of Te Kohanga Reo and Kura Kaupapa Māori were initially about the survival of the language, they did become part of a wider movement encapsulated in the 2003 Ministry of Education's Māori strategic plan that positioned such initiatives as a means of self-determination for Māori to have full access to their culture, language, resources and tikanga. Graham Hingangaroa Smith sees this as a "shift in mindset of large numbers of Māori people...[to being proactive and motivated]...in a reawakening of the Māori imagination that had been stifled and diminished by colonization processes."

1980s and 1990s reforms

Background
During the 1970s there were increasing calls to review the nature and direction of the centralised education system.  The two-year Educational Conference completed in 1974, convened by the then Minister of Education Phil Amos, was a consultation process [involving]..."50,000 parents, teachers, administrators and interested laypeople...debating many aspects of the education system." It encouraged more participation by parents and the wider community in educational decision-making and concluded that there were issues of alienation and frustration within the bureaucracy which they felt was "vast, ponderous and unresponsive, particularly to the special needs of women and girls, Maori and other minorities all of whom were gaining a new assertiveness in this period." The Conference also questioned whether there was equality of opportunity and suggested targeting funding to support the groups in society who were being disadvantaged. Emanating from the Conference was The Working Party on Organisation and Administration (1974) chaired by Arnold Nordmeyer. In their report, some of the key recommendations, which were effectively calls for devolution of the centralised system, suggested more involvement by parents in primary school committees and secondary boards of governors, which should have a role in the appointment of staff.

Other reports raised concerns about education in New Zealand.  Towards Partnership, known as the McComb Report (1976), said that "flaws" in the system included the lack of parental involvement and "concentration of power in the Department of Education"; and the Scott Report, An Inquiry into the Quality of Teaching in 1986, noted that for teacher training to be effective, there needed to be research-based "theoretical and practical components...[and ]...the required teaching skills and competencies should be clearly identified."

Against this backdrop New Zealand education underwent major reforms in the 1980s.  One historian said these came about because "a combination of economic difficulties, societal polarisation and the rise of a new post-war generation to political power saw the creation of a common discourse emanating from all parts of the political spectrum, demanding radical educational reform." This has been described as a challenge to the consensus of the time that the state was beneficent and efficient, by both a "radical  left-wing critique that highlighted the continuing inequalities of education" and a 'New Right' perspective that "questioned the character and effects of state involvement".  These positions emanated from the perception at the time that within education there was "provider-capture by self interested state sector professionals". But the challenge to the concept that the state mechanisms were "disinterested upholders of the public good...[allowed]...an ideologically disparate coalition of interests [to articulate] a common policy discourse centering  on the need for radical structural reforms in education...to threaten the educational status quo."

The 1984 - 1990 Labour government led by David Lange introduced a range of free market, neoliberal economic reforms and some of the briefings and documents at the time indicated this approach was likely to be reflected in the education reforms. In 1987 New Zealand Treasury produced a brief to the Labour government, the second part of which dealt exclusively with education. The paper acknowledged that there was "much in the state system with which to be satisfied", but identified concerns related to  "significant numbers of children and young people [who] are disadvantaged in terms of the present institutional and financing structures... structures [being] inequitable in that they involve a transfer of wealth from lower to higher income groups...[and]... that some educational outcomes are either declining or not improving to an extent commensurate with increasing educational inputs." For primary school education, government intervention was seen as necessary in the interests of equity of outcomes, equality of opportunity and "values clarification". Attention was drawn to the importance of a strong partnership between families and schools to support successful implementation of the four functions of education: to fulfil, integrate and provide children with skills and a custodial role to "lesson the burden of child-rearing on parents."

The document also noted significantly that..."in the technical sense used by economists, education is not in fact a 'public good', that it is "never free...[and]...educational services are like other goods traded in the market place."
 
In April 1987 the Labour government released The Curriculum Review after two years of community consultation and debate. It proposed guidelines for a national curriculum to be "accessible to every student; non-racist and non-sexist; able to ensure significant success for all students; whole; balanced; of the highest quality for every student; planned; co-operatively designed; responsive, inclusive, enabling, enjoyable."  While the document was viewed favourably within the education sector, the Treasury said that it did not deal with the relationship between education and the economy or have an approach to manage the issues of consumer choice.  One commentator noted that this Review was not acknowledged in any way in what was to become a major reform process beginning with the establishment of The Taskforce to Review Education Administration that produced Administering for Excellence, known as the Picot Report.

"Administering for Excellence"

With an upcoming general election later in the year, The Taskforce to Review Education Administration announced on 21 July 1987 was said to be a response by the Labour government to increasing public pressure to radically reform education after "intense parliamentary debate...[and]...an increasing number of articles highly critical of education" in the media.  The chairperson, Brian Picot, had a high profile in the retail industry, having served as a director of several major New Zealand companies.  He was also involved in public service being president of the Auckland Chamber of Commerce in 1975 and Pro-Vice Chancellor of Auckland University in the 1990s and in  2001 was "inducted into the Fairfax Business Hall of Fame in 2001 and made a distinguished fellow of the Institute of Directors in 2007." The other Taskforce members were: Associate Professor Peter Ramsay a prominent educational researcher and critic of "bureaucratic conservatism"; Margaret Rosemergy a Wellington Teachers College lecturer and chair of the Onslow College Board of Governors; Whetumarama Wereta from the Department of Māori Affairs, a "social researcher of Ngāi Te Rangi-Ngāti Ranginui descent who had served on the Royal Commission on the Electoral System"; and Colin Wise, a Dunedin businessman with "educational experience as a University of Otago Council member and a past member of a secondary school board of governors."

Organisations initially invited to meet with the Taskforce were the New Zealand Māori Council, the Kohanga Reo Trust and the Māori Women's Welfare League, while the teachers' union was excluded because of concerns from some organisations about possible "provider-capture".

By the time of the Taskforce's first meeting on 31 July 1987, the members had viewed relevant briefs, key policy documents, recommendations and student achievement data, specifically 1986 data that showed poor exit qualifications of Māori students.  It is recorded that at this initial meeting, there was agreement the proposed report was to be more than a discussion document and expected to be acted upon quickly by the government, and it would be necessary to radically change an education system identified as "too complex and too unresponsive."

The final report, Administering for excellence, was released in April 1988. The Report identified five main issues of concern in New Zealand's education system: "over-centralisation of decision-making; complexity; lack of information and choice; lack of effective management practices; and feeling of powerlessness among parents, communities and practitioners."  The Taskforce recommended the replacement of the Department of Education by a Ministry of Education and the abolition of regional regional education boards.  It further suggested that "all schools to become autonomous, self-managing learning institutions, controlled by locally elected boards of trustees, responsible for learning outcomes, budgeting, and the employment of teachers...[and]...produce a charter outlining the school's mission in relation to its clientele and community, incorporating centrally prescribed requirements of safety, equity and national standards." The Report acknowledged the role of biculturalism in education and claimed "that the new structure it recommended would help achieve Māori aspirations."

"Tomorrow's Schools"
In August 1988 the newly re-elected Labour Government, with David Lange as Minister of Education, published Tomorrow's Schools which accepted most of the recommendations of the Picot Report.

The government replaced the Department of Education with new bodies. The Ministry of Education (MoE) was to provide policy advice to, the Minister of Education without becoming a direct provider of educational services. Other functions of the MoE included reviewing the curriculum, establishing national guidelines for education, approving charters and managing capital works in schools. The Education Review Office (ERO) was to be an independent review agency that ensured charter goals were achieved and the Boards of Trustees were to be responsible for establishing charters as a "contract between the community, the school and the state" with the goal of establishing more autonomy for schools.  Other bodies that later came to be recognised included the New Zealand Qualifications Authority (NZQA) and The Tertiary Education Commission. The changes reflected concerns expressed in the Picot report about too much middle management in education and the new system was said to "enable greater community involvement"  because Boards of Trustees, drawn from the community, would directly administer schools.

Legislation giving effect to the changes came with the passing of the Education Act 1989. Under this Act Regional Boards, which had been set up by Provincial Governments and split into 12 (reduced to 10 by 1966) Education Boards in 1877, were abolished. Schools became autonomous entities, managed by Boards of Trustees and as of 2022, this model continues.  In 1989, the school leaving age was raised from 15 years to 16 years.

Reception and commentary on the reforms
The New Zealand Government commissioned an independent history of the reforms in 1998.  The authors acknowledge that while the changes were radical, they did reflect a debate about the role of the state in providing education that had been ongoing in the country since the 1877 Education Bill.  Issues of financial accountability, standards of performance, centralisation versus devolution and whether the purpose of education is to benefit mainly individuals or society, had always been a concern and the 1989 Taskforce led by Picot dealt with these in a way described as "philosophically conservative, in that they were built on one of the founding traditions of public education in New Zealand." The Picot Report of 1988 has been seen as a "high-level initiative" that acknowledged and responded to increasingly complex social political issues which had led to criticisms of the education system from a variety of interests, including those with a neoliberalism agenda to radical Marxist. While this commentator sees that to some extent there was a divergence in the Picot Report from the "liberal-progressive assumptions" strongly reflected in the Currie Report of 1962, the work of the Taskforce to Review Education Administration, in producing Administering for excellence, is seen as "an important attempt to restore public confidence in the ability of the state education system to create social equality...[and in this sense]...is squarely in the dominant tradition of educational policy in twentieth century New Zealand." 
 
One school of thought holds that the changes were driven by free market ideologies that had been imported into New Zealand following similar reforms in the United Kingdom and Australia and which aligned with the neoliberal reform programmes of the 1984 - 1990 Labour government. One paper claimed that, driven by the New Zealand Treasury, it was a battle between "New Right agencies" and the principles of "Welfare Labourism" that had originated with the first Labour Government of 1935–1949, "as part of its political commitment to the creation of a just and more equitable society...[with]...education at the centre of its plans for social, political, and economic transformation." This author continues that Treasury was by the 1980s "the ideological agency for the propagation of the principles and concepts of the New Right into areas of social and educational policy...[and their brief to the incoming government in 1987]...demonstrated an unprecedented attempt by Treasury officials to influence the direction and nature of future education policy in New Zealand."  Supporting this position, another commentator holds that New Zealand has an historical commitment to establishing an educational system  based on fairness, equality of opportunity and choice, yet the reforms highlighted a paradox between  the "apparent commitment to the social goals of both equity and choice in the pursuit of greater efficiencies" that created a dilemma for the government when designing and implementing such radical changes.

Although representatives from the New Zealand Treasury and the State Services Commission(SSC), two agencies that review and assist coordinating government policies, were only invited to participate in the Picot Taskforce from the second meeting and then without voting rights, the impact and influence of both organisations on the reforms of the New Zealand education system has been a source of debate.  A paper by two academics maintains that while Treasury had an ongoing interest in education, the SSC had a "far more powerful and direct influence on the education system", a perspective that the authors say was "neglected in the face of the neo-liberal argument."  The argument followed is that while the Treasury saw "responsiveness, choice and competition" as the key elements of educational reform, the brief of the SSC was for more accountability and effectiveness of the State education system, with little overlap between the two positions.  In moving in the direction of reforming education by changing the machinery of government, the SSC took a strong position that the problem was one of "producer capture" in the sector and its brief was to advise on how this could be overseen by performance management of staff and other good employer provisions.  This became relevant to education with the passing of the State Sector Act 1988 which effectively positioned schools as "government departments headed by CEOs who were to be engaged on 5-year contracts and to take full responsibility for appointments to and the performance, of their department",  and the SSC as the de facto collective employer of teachers. This was a  situation that was problematic for the authors of this paper because they saw that  "the central importance of the SSC's intervention in education...[meant that]...the education reforms...[were]...much more marked by the reform of public administration than they [were] to do with direct changes to education."  Another paper took the view that this changed the position of teachers within the system from being professionals to "just employees of individual schools" but without access to any "policy-making decisions...[in a role]...limited to operational matters." Geoffrey Leane, from the University of Canterbury School of Law, noted that under such a system the "professional context for teachers – including matters of discipline, classification, training and working hours – now lay in the hands of the new managers, the Board of Trustees".  According to Leane this could led to a "low-trust model... arguably at the expense of more subtle qualities (such as commitment, loyalty, sense of public duty, collegiality) that imbued the professional model." The writer concludes that "accountability is now a formal, externally imposed thing reflecting low trust in the professional teacher."

There have been other challenges to the theory that the educational reforms of the late 1980s were only a reflection of imported neo-liberal ideology,  with one commentary noting that this [ignores] "the cumulative impact of indigenous factors." Some of these factors resulted from challenges to a centralised bureaucracy, with claims from feminist groups that it was a "male-dominated, hierarchical structure". Māori activists said the system was failing Māori students and this led to the National Advisory Committee on Māori Education (NACME) advocating for the creation of a "bicultural society whereby much educational decision-making would be devolved from a largely Pākehā bureaucracy to Māori"...[which because of the rise of Te Kohanga reo]... "further highlighted the case for educational reform along the lines of devolution and consumer choice." A paper was published in 2001 that examined how Tomorrow's Schools reforms had affected the development of Kura Kaupapa Māori.  The author noted that key principles of the Picot Report were effectively aimed at devolving more decision making to schools in the interest of meeting community needs, but while this appeared to offer an opportunity for Māori, the philosophy of Picot did not offer "pluralism...[and]...was essentially a mainstream initiative geared to the needs and aspirations of Pakeha and arguably the middle class."  The paper contends that while Kura Kaupapa Māori are acknowledged directly in the Tomorrow's Schools document, they are defined as  'special character schools' rather than an initiative reflecting a partnership under the obligations of the Treaty of Waitangi. Pita Sharples framed this as: "Kura Kaupapa Māori does not equate with any of the school types outlined in Tomorrows Schools and accordingly it is not catered for- in the proposed transition of schools in the current reform of education administration." Tuhiwai Smith sees it as "disappointing" that 'whanau' is one of few Māori words in the Tomorrow's School document because Kura Kaupapa Māori were "designed by Māori for Māori...and many of its key elements are situated in a different framework" [from] other special or mainstream schools. Significantly, in 2014, the Education Review Office (ERO) released  a framework for reviewing Kura Kaupapa Māori with a methodology that:
 acknowledges the diversity of Kura Kaupapa Māori
 recognises culturally specific features
 values observable behaviour and whānau practice.
 aims to empower kura by strengthening their methods of internal evaluation.

In 1999 a group of New Zealand educationalists wrote a paper discussing the process that resulted in Tomorrow's Schools as "an interaction between two agendas: one for more equity and the other for more choice...[and]... The Picot Report was released on 10 May 1988 with only 6-7 weeks allowed for public submissions", seen as insufficient time to process over 20,000 submissions that had been received. This paper also contends that there were no clear aims of the reforms and it was difficult to find data - other than that submitted by Treasury in their 1987 brief to the government which justified the position that the aim of equality had not been met and the system therefore needed reforming.  The authors conclude that led to an inference the proposed new system, likely to be market driven, would improve educational equality, but the debate was clouded by a reluctance of those in favour the reforms to analyse them and those opposed, to criticizing perceived underlying ideologies of the government.

The "marketizing" of education in New Zealand as a result of the reforms has been discussed by several commentators. One said that not only were parents' needs unmet, but they actually felt their children could be at risk in a "climate of intensived competition." A common strand in the discussion has been to challenge the idea that the market is the fairest way of distributing resources and competition ensures the provision of services that are sensitive to the needs of stakeholders as "consumers" in a process claimed to reflect "the neoliberal advocacy of economic efficiency over social need."  Further comment noted that because neoliberalism supports individualism, and a belief that "all citizens are  motivated mainly by self interest", any interference by the state will threaten individual freedom. The writer continues that after Tomorrow's Schools education in New Zealand was a commodity that could be brought or sold and which operated in an environment of "market signals" to indicate levels of satisfaction by parents but which could only be truly contestable if all schools had "no zones, no special state protection, and the same level of state funding"  Writers in the Journal of Economic Literature however, after reviewing an assessment of the reforms in New Zealand, agreed "that predicted benefits were overstated, that there were both losers and winners, and that educational nirvana did not result...[but]...the main impact was to make schools' problems more transparent, creating discomforting pressures and attempts to undermine this transparency.

Understanding how schools could be marketed in a country like New Zealand, with a history of state control of education, has been explored through the concept of quasi-market.  This can be seen a rationale for managing what one commentator calls an "insoluble contradiction" for any state that uses neo-liberal policies but wants compulsory education.  The quasi-market model legitimizes continued state funding of education while allowing choice and competition.  Following the educational reforms in New Zealand in the late 1980s, schools are funded on the basis of student numbers, so within a quasi-market environment, a focus priority of schools becomes to build and maintain high roll numbers. This leads to a variation of funding amongst schools. Those better able to promote themselves are in areas of the country that reflect the culture of middle-class European and wealthy immigrant families, while schools where the population is of a lower socio-economic status have less funding and often a transient student body. It has been claimed therefore, that the main driver of parent choice under a free market, is related to "the class and ethnic nature of the area in which the schools are located."

Two reports in 2009 assessed the impact of Tomorrow's Schools on New Zealand education twenty years after their implementation.  Cathy Wylie, Chief Researcher at the New Zealand Council for Educational Research (NZCER), positioned the education system as still coming to terms with the complexities of self-managing schools and looking to develop relationships to build capacity and efficiency through support that focussed  more on teaching and learning than administration.  Wylie describes the beginning of a "coherent" developmental approach to professional development with ongoing evaluation or self-review that could shift schools "from thinking about accountability in terms of compliance...[and more]...in strategic terms of ongoing development - real self-management." Another publication collated essays that considered several issues that needed to be resolved before the goals of Tomorrow's Schools could be realised.

National standards 
On 10 April 2007 the governing National Party released a policy for National Standards requiring all primary and intermediate schools in New Zealand to focus on clear standards in literacy and numeracy, effective assessment programmes and "plain language" reporting to parents. A stated rationale for National Standards was for shared expectations about achievement and identifying students who risked not gaining basic skills. The Education (National Standards) Amendment Bill, introduced to the New Zealand Parliament on 13 December 2008, gave the Minister of Education, Anne Tolley the power to begin a consultation round with the education sector to set and design national standards in literacy and numeracy against which schools would be required to report parents after using "assessment programmes that compare the progress of their students with those standards."  Schools would be able to choose from a range of assessment tools, [and]..."parents [would] have the right to see all assessment information and receive regular plain English reports about their child's progress towards national standards." In August 2009, Tolley, announced a timeline for the implementation of the Standards, noting it as an assessment and reporting initiative  to "lift the levels of achievement in literacy and numeracy for New Zealand children in primary and intermediate schools." In a letter to  Boards of Trustees, principals and teachers at New Zealand schools, Tolley said the Standards were addressing the fact that "nearly one in five of our young people leave school without the skills and qualifications they need to succeed...[and]...from 2012, school annual reports will include data that shows progress and achievement in relation to the standards, for all students, against targets set in 2011 charters."

Concerns were expressed early about the haste in introducing the Standards and that they had not been trialled. Jennifer Clarke, President of the Otago Primary Principals Association asked for a "robust trial of the National Standards to prove accuracy, credibility and positive impact on student achievement...[and that]...there is no school ranking lists." Possible league tables which could result in schools being ranked was also seen as problematic by John Hattie. The Principals' Association of Otaki-Kapiti sent a remit to Tolley in August 2010 recommending that schools in this area did not participate in National Standards until there was a working partnership between Tolley and the schools.  Tolley said this group of schools represented a "vocal minority who were unhappy with National Standards", however New Zealand Principals' Federation President Ernie Buutveld said "there is a growing solidarity around the country to get a resolution the sector can live with." Other principals' associations from around New Zealand had concerns such as the possible assumption within process that "all children can achieve at the same level at the same time each year", that the Standards could narrow the curriculum to a focus on just literacy and numeracy, and they are "not designed to reflect a Māori world view and will therefore once again, be an ‘assessment tool’ that marginalises Māori learners within our education system."

Academic critique of the rationale for the Standards included questioning why the Minister was focusing on literacy and numeracy when data suggested there were issues related to assessment in other areas of the curriculum, and the absence of proof the standards would work, they were complex and it would be difficult to moderate data that had been gathered from different sources.  An open letter to Tolley from academics saw some merit in the concept of clearly identifying levels of student achievement but noted "flaws" in the system, including the possible labelling of students as "failures" and undermining of the curriculum.  Anne Tolley was asked during questioning in the New Zealand Parliament on 10 December 2009 about her understanding of comments by John Hattie in the open letter. She said Hattie had stated that "standards were wonderful opportunities for refreshing and reinvigorating an already top of the world system...[and]...if implemented well, can make a huge difference." Introduced in an interview by the NZ Herald, as "the Government's favourite education advisor", Hattie said that he supported "standards-based learning" but was not consulted by the Government and challenged claims made of widespread failure in the New Zealand school system. He also noted that national standards had been "introduced in the US, Britain and Australia but none of these countries have been able to show any overall improvement in student achievement."

Between 25 May and 3 July 2009, the Ministry of Education received submissions on the proposed National Standards from parents, teachers, principals and Boards of Trustees. These submissions were analysed by the New Zealand Council for Educational Research (NZCER) and the  findings were submitted in a report to the Ministry of Education in August 2009. The report showed that parents were generally supportive of the concept of learning goals for their child and the different ways they could get information about achievement, with 49% saying that the most important way schools could help them support their child's learning was to "share information about child's progress in timely way with good access to teachers."  However, 38% of parent did express concerns, compared to 14% who had a positive response when asked for further comments. Analysis of the submissions from the education sector showed there were concerns about possible "labelling" of students, how the standards would work for students with special needs, a possible narrowing of the curriculum and teaching practice and fear that data could be published in leagues tables comparing schools. However, the views of this group did emphasize "the usefulness of parents having clear, timely, honest, accurate and valid information about their child's progress, and a picture that covered ―the whole child as an individual, looking to the future through setting goals together, as well as reporting on current performance."

In a move that was generally seen as appropriate, the Government abandoned its plans to implement the Standards in 2010 after it had been "revealed that primary school league tables could be constructed out of the standards." Tolley confirmed that schools would not be required to report back to officials on pupils' performance against the standards until 2012. Frances Nelson the New Zealand Educational Institute (NZEI) president said the implementation was "staged" and "logical" and Tolley had agreed with the sector's concerns and "been prepared to change the way that initially she thought it might work".

Initially some schools were not compliant with the assessment and reporting process and in 2012, Hekia Parata, the then Minister of Education, said in the media that non-compliance was "unacceptable" because schools were crown entities and information was public. In the same article, former prime minister John Key said schools should "get in line with the programme...everybody else is, and the reason they should be doing that is it's good for our kids."

Parata said on 11 June 2013 that National Standards data showed some "concerning trends" including achievement being "significantly lower for Māori and Pasifika learners than for others" and boys trailing girls. She felt overall there were some "small, incremental increase in reading, writing and mathematics results" and that there were good support programmes in place to "accelerate" progress in these areas. In the same article, it  was announced that there was to be an advisory group of experts in the field set up by the Ministry of Education to look at the data and make recommendations for improvement. A press release from NZCER on 29 November 2013 summarised the findings of a survey into the impact of National Standards. The data showed only 7% of principals and 15% of teachers thought the standards themselves were robust, while trustees and some parents said they had a good understanding of the standards. The summary concluded that  "there has been no marked difference in student achievement since the standards were introduced and no evidence that standards have spurred parents of low performing students to become more engaged in their children's learning." The data was discussed in more detail in a paper presented at the New Zealand Association for Research in Education (RARE) conference in Dunedin on 26–28 December 2013. A survey in 2016 concluded from the data that "National Standards have been incorporated into teaching and learning and used by school leaders as indicators of student need, experiences of using them continue to raise questions about their role in student learning and performance."

Educational reforms 2017-2022

Removal of National Standards
The Labour government on 12 December 2017 announced the abolishment of the national standards in reading, writing and maths. Education Minister Chris Hipkins said parents had lost confidence in the standards and from next year schools would no longer be required to report their students' results in the standards to the Ministry of Education. The announcement had been anticipated since the Labour-led government took power as all three parties involved in the government campaigned on promises of getting rid of the benchmarks for primary and intermediate school children. The decision was welcomed and widely supported.

Review of Tomorrow's Schools
While there were conservative curriculum reforms completed in the 1990s, followed by more comprehensive and contemporary reforms updating what was taught in schools for the 21st century, there were later calls to review the model put in place under Tomorrow's Schools.  On 21 February 2018, the media reported that it was likely Chris Hipkins, as part of an "enduring 30 year approach to education", would announce a review of many aspects of the education system, including Tomorrows Schools.  When the review was confirmed, one commentator said that success depended on the initiative reflecting a "genuine partnership model with the Government and the ongoing political tinkering needs to be kept to a minimum."  The Terms of Reference for the review state: "The primary purpose of the review of Tomorrow's Schools will be to consider if the governance, management and administration of the schooling system is fit for purpose to ensure that every learner achieves educational success" and the independent taskforce was appointed on 3 April 2018.

Curriculum review

By 2018, the focus on educational change by the government had moved toward a review of the curriculum.  In 2019 a report from the Curriculum Progress, and Achievement Ministerial Advisory Group, provided advice on improving the curriculum, identifying "focus areas for Māori medium and English medium settings which shaped the recommendations to Cabinet, including addressing aspects of trust and equity." As a response, in September 2019, Chris Hipkins confirmed that "Aotearoa New Zealand's histories would be taught in all schools and kura from 2022, which has now been revised to 2023 to give schools and kura more time to engage with curriculum content." Pressure for this to be compulsory had come from petitions to the New Zealand parliament in 2015 and 2019, and ongoing academic and public debate. An extensive process of consultation began in 2020 when two Curriculum Writing Groups drafted content for Aotearoa New Zealand's histories in The New Zealand Curriculum and Te Takanga o Te Wā in Te Marautanga o Aotearoa, with the content being surveyed, trialled and reviewed in 2021

There was mixed reception to the draft documents. Some concerns were expressed about possible gaps in the history to be covered, there were questions raised about the focus on content rather than the process of how students learn, and the  point raised by a politician that the emphasis on studying colonisation was likely to cause divisions amongst New Zealanders, was discussed  in detail by one academic. Positive responses included comments from the New Zealand Historical Association and a review by the New Zealand Council for Educational Research that indicated feedback from the public that the content was timely  and "overdue".

The final version of the documents were launched on 17 March 2022. Aotearoa New Zealand's histories, while a standalone document, is aligned with the English-medium New Zealand Curriculum. The structure and content involving focusing on "big ideas" in New Zealand history was challenged by Brooke van Velden as being over focused on colonisation and promoting a narrative that ignores the multiethnic nature of New Zealand Society and is just about "two sets of people, Māori and Pākehā". James Shaw however said it is important to deal honestly with the past; an academic noted the new approach as reflecting New Zealand had matured as a society; and the president of The Maori Principals' Association, saw the curriculum as potentially transformational.  Te Takanga o Te Wā is a new strand in the Māori-medium curriculum, Te Matauranga o Aotearoa which recognises that students explore history by learning about themselves and connections to the world, "to understand their own identity as Māori in Aotearoa."

Controversies 
From 2012 the Ministry came under fire over a number of different issues including staffing, the Novopay payroll system, the closure and merger of schools in Christchurch, the implementation of charter schools, and the management of school buildings.

Resignation of Lesley Longstone 
Lesley Longstone was recruited from Britain where her last role was overseeing the introduction of a UK version of charter schools in Britain. She was appointed as chief executive for the Ministry of Education in New Zealand with a five-year contract starting in July 2012 and a salary of $660,000 a year. She was recruited from England and given a "relocation payout" of $50,000 which "covers flights, freight, up to eight weeks' accommodation and visa expenses".

Chief executives recruited from overseas only have to repay the grant if they leave the job within a year. Longstone held the position for 13 months before she was pushed into resigning after her relationship with Education Minister Hekia Parata became 'strained'. She was paid $425,000 in severance pay.

Class sizes 
In May 2012, Education Minister, Hekia Parata, announced changes to the education sector which would raise the level of qualification required by teachers - including a minimum requirement of postgraduate degrees for teacher trainees. Because of proposed budget cuts, she also announced there would be a loss of specialized  teaching staff in intermediate schools and a corresponding increase in class sizes. However, it was Treasury rather than the Ministry of Education which was responsible for promoting this strategy "which essentially rates teacher quality as a more critical factor than class size".

As Education Minister, Parata was given the job of selling the policy to the sector. She claimed the changes would save $43 million a year and that: "About 90 per cent of schools will have a net loss of less than one full-time teacher equivalent as a result of the combined effect of the ratio changes and projected roll growth." Over the next few months, teachers and parents alike voiced their concerns about the proposed changes especially when it was revealed that the new ratios would cause some schools to lose up to seven teachers. Because of public backlash, in June 2012 Parata announced the Government would not go ahead with the policy and acknowledged it had caused "a disproportionate amount of anxiety for parents".

Novopay 

In 2012, the Ministry rolled out a new payroll system for teachers and other school staff called Novopay run by the Australian company Talent 2. From the outset, the system led to widespread problems with over 8,000 teachers receiving the wrong pay and in some cases no pay at all; within a few months, 90% of schools were affected.

The 'Novopay débâcle' as it was called received almost daily media attention, causing embarrassment for the new Minister of Education Hekia Parata, and leading to the resignation of newly recruited Education secretary Lesley Longstone. The Australian Financial Review says: "The débâcle bears similarities to the botched $500 million payroll implementation at Queensland Health by IBM" which is expected to end up costing $1.25 billion.

Hekia Parata was relieved of her duties towards Novopay by the prime minister and replaced by Steven Joyce but problems continued and prior to the September 2014 election Joyce admitted that Novopay would be taken over and run by the government as he saw no hope that Novopay could be made into an efficient, viable organization.

In 2014 the National Government announced that it was terminating the Novopay contract and would be forming a new government-run organisation to take over. This was implemented in October 2014.

School closures in Christchurch 
In September 2012, newly appointed Education Minister, Hekia Parata, announced that 13 schools in Christchurch would be closed and 18 would be merged following the earthquakes the previous year. In an editorial, the New Zealand Herald said: "Of all the mishaps in education this year, the Christchurch school plan was the most telling. To read the plan was to see a Ministry utterly out of touch with the people its schools are supposed to serve. The earthquakes had left a number of schools damaged and some of their communities decimated. Some closures would be required. But not nearly as many as the ministry decided."

After further consultation, the Government backtracked. On 18 February, Ministry of Education staff visited the 31 schools under the Ministry's spotlight to tell teachers and principals in person which schools would be closed. Seven schools would close and twelve would merge creating another five closures. Another twelve schools originally proposed for closure or merger would now remain unaffected. In March 2013 the Ombudsman announced an investigation would be held into the way the Education Ministry conducted its consultation process on schools closures and mergers to see if they were done in "a manner that adequately ensures fair and meaningful participation by affected parties".

Charter schools 

The National government agreed to the introduction of charter schools in 2011 as part of its arrangement with John Banks for the support of the ACT Party after the election. Catherine Isaac, a former Act president, says charter schools would not have to follow Ministry of Education requirements but would be free to set their own timetables, school terms and teacher working conditions.

The proposal for charter schools aroused considerable opposition, not just from teachers groups. Speaking to a parliamentary committee, New Zealand Principals' Federation president Philip Harding said: "There is no public mandate to pursue this policy." The New Zealand School Trustees Association expressed concerns about allowing people to teach who are not registered teachers. The Chief Ombudsman, Dame Beverley Wakem, expressed concern that making charter schools exempt from public scrutiny was "unconstitutional"  and would detract from public confidence. In February 2013, visiting American Karran Harper Royal told the education and science committee in Parliament that "charter schools have been a failed experiment in New Orleans" and the Government should not proceed with them.

John O'Neill, professor of teacher education at Massey University's Institute of Education says the Bill proposing the establishment of charter schools is  "undemocratic and patronising". The Education Amendment Bill euphemistically refers to them as 'partnership' schools - but O'Neill says "the so-called partnership will only be between the Government and a private 'sponsor' which may be for-profit and have no prior connection with the local community". He says parents will have no right of representation on the school's governing body as they do in state schools, and the Minister of Education can set up a charter school without even consulting the local community.

Leaky schools 

By March 2013, 305 schools were reported as having problems with cladding and weather-tightness issues which is expected to cost the Ministry up to $1.4 billion to repair. These schools were built or modified between 1995 and 2005, and are an extension of the leaky homes crisis which has affected many New Zealand homes of the same era. At Te Rapa school (near Hamilton) so many of the classrooms were affected the entire school was "forced to play musical classrooms" for over a year while repairs were being done. Principal Vaughan Franklin described it as a 'massive disruption' which threatened the quality of teaching. So far only 61 schools have been repaired.

In 2013 the Ministry was involved in legal action over 87 schools to rectify damage caused by "poor design, workmanship, quality control, and materials failure" and is holding architects, designers and builders liable for the cost of repairs. Contractors are liable for the cost if the building work was undertaken within the past 10 years.

Weathertightness issues have also been identified with several 1970s-built secondary schools constructed to the "S 68" design. These schools were designed with low-pitched roofs and protruding wooden clerestory windows in pre-1977 schools (schools built from 1977 have skylights), which in recent years have started to cause problems in areas with relatively high rainfall. The original prototype buildings at Porirua College (opened in 1968, hence "S 68"), have progressively been replaced with modern building since 2007, while extensive re-roofing projects have taken place at other schools, including Waiopehu College in Levin and Awatapu College in Palmerston North.

See also
History of New Zealand
Aotearoa New Zealand's histories
Vincent O'Malley

References

External links
  Catching the Knowledge Wave?, Gilbert, J. 2005, NZCER Press